Fade out, Fade-out or Fadeout may refer to:

Technical engineering 
 Fade-out or fade, a gradual decrease in sound volume
 Fade (lighting) or fade-out, a gradual decrease in intensity of a stage lighting source
 Dissolve (filmmaking) or fade-out, a cinematographic technique causing the picture to darken and disappear

Fiction 
 Fadeout (novel), a 1970 novel by Joseph Hansen
 The Fade Out, a 2014 comic book by Ed Brubaker and Sean Phillips
 Fadeout, a 1959 novel by Douglas Woolf
 Fade-Out, a 1975 science fiction novel by Patrick Tilley

Music 
 Fade Out (album), a 1988 album by Loop
 "Fade Out", a song by James Bay from Electric Light
 "Fade Out", a song by Seether from Holding Onto Strings Better Left to Fray
"Fade Out", a song by Seeb and Olivia O'Brien

Television 
 "Fadeout" (Arrow), the series finale of Arrow
 "Fade Out" (CSI: Miami), an episode of CSI: Miami
 "Fade Out" (Hercules), an episode of Hercules: The Legendary Journeys

Other 
 Fade Out: The Calamitous Final Days of MGM, a 1990 book by Peter Bart

See also 
 Fade (disambiguation)
 Fade in (disambiguation)
 "Fade Out/In", a song by Paloalto
 "Fade Out, Fade In", an episode of M*A*S*H
 Fade Out – Fade In, a 1964 Broadway musical
 "Street Spirit (Fade Out)", a song by Radiohead